Major General Ernest Ord Lewin,  (7 April 1879 – 10 May 1950) was a senior British Army officer who served as General Officer Commanding Malaya Command from 1934 to 1935.

Military career
Lewin was educated at Winchester College, for which he played cricket, and King's College, Cambridge. He was commissioned into the Royal Field Artillery as a second lieutenant on 26 May 1900, and was promoted to lieutenant on 9 April 1902. In his early career, he served as a Staff Officer in India and in the United Kingdom, before become an adjutant in 1914.

Lewin served in the First World War as a General Staff Officer in France. In 1927 he was appointed Brigadier Royal Artillery at Aldershot Command and in 1934 he became General Officer Commanding Malaya Command. He was made commander of the 55th (West Lancashire) Infantry Division in 1935 and retired in 1938. He was re-employed during the Second World War as General Officer Commanding Portsmouth Area in 1939 and then as Major-General in Charge of Administration for Southern Command in 1940; he retired again in 1941.

Family
Lewin married and had one son and one daughter.

References

External links
Generals of World War II

 

|-

1879 births
1950 deaths
British Army major generals
Royal Artillery officers
British Army generals of World War II
Companions of the Order of the Bath
Companions of the Order of St Michael and St George
Companions of the Distinguished Service Order
People educated at Winchester College
Alumni of King's College, Cambridge
British Army personnel of World War I